Udea stationalis is a moth in the family Crambidae. It was described by Hiroshi Yamanaka in 1988. It is found on the island of Honshu in Japan and in the province of Fujian in China.

The wingspan is 15–20 mm.

References

stationalis
Moths described in 1988